Jim Bridwell (July 29, 1944 – February 16, 2018) was an American rock climber and mountaineer, active since 1965, especially in Yosemite Valley, but also in Patagonia and Alaska. He was noted for pushing the standards of both free climbing and big-wall climbing, and later alpine climbing. He wrote numerous articles on climbing for leading sport publications.  He was an apprentice to Royal Robbins and Warren Harding.  He was the unofficial leader of the Stonemasters.

Bridwell is credited with over 100 First Ascents in Yosemite Valley, in addition to conducting the first one-day ascent of The Nose of El Capitan on May 26, 1975, with John Long and Billy Westbay. He founded Yosemite National Park's Search and Rescue Team (YOSAR), and spearheaded many rescues that became textbook for search-and-rescue operations. He was a leading force in the changing techniques of climbing and an innovator/inventor of widely used and copied climbing gear, including copperheads and bird beaks.

Bridwell resided in Palm Desert, California, until his death on February 16, 2018, from complications of hepatitis C, which he had acquired while receiving a tattoo in Borneo during the 1980s.

First ascents and notable ascents 
 1965 Entrance Exam (II 5.9), Arch Rock, Yosemite, California with Chuck Pratt, Chris Fredericks and Larry Marshik
 1966 Braille Book (III 5.8), Higher Cathedral Rock, Yosemite, California, with Chris Fredericks, Joe Faint and Brian Berry.
 1967 East Face (VI 5.9 A4), Higher Cathedral Rock, Yosemite, California, with Chris Fredericks
 1967 South Central (V 5.10a A2), Washington Column, Yosemite, California, with Joe Faint
 1969 Triple Direct (VI 5.9 A2), El Capitan, Yosemite, California, with Kim Schmitz
 1971 Aquarian Wall (VI 5.9 A4), El Capitan, Yosemite, California, with Kim Schmitz
 1971 New Dimensions (5.11 A1), Arch Rock, Yosemite, California, with Mark Klemens
 1971 Nabisco Wall, The Cookie, Yosemite, California,
 1970 Vain Hope (V 5.7 A3), Ribbon Falls, Yosemite, California with Royal Robbins and Kim Schmitz
 1973 Central Pillar of Frenzy, Middle Cathedral Rock, Yosemite, California, with Roger Breedlove and Ed Barry
 1974 Freestone, Geek Towers, Yosemite Falls, Yosemite, California
 1975 Wailing Wall, Tuolumne Meadows, California with Dale Bard and Rick Accomozo
1975 The Nose (5.13+ or 5.8 C2), El Capitan, Yosemite, California, with Billy Westbay, and John Long, first one-day ascent in 17:45 
 1975 Pacific Ocean Wall (VI 5.9 A4), El Capitan, Yosemite, California, with Bill Westbay, Jay Fiske and Fred East
 1976 Gold Ribbon (VI 5.10 A3), Ribbon Falls, Yosemite, California with Mike Graham
 1977 Bushido (VI 5.10 A4), Half Dome, Yosemite, California with Dale Bard
 1978 Sea of Dreams (VI 5.9 A5), El Capitan, Yosemite, California with Dale Bard and Dave Diegelman
 1978 Zenith (VI 5.9 A4), Half Dome, Yosemite, California with Kim Schmitz
 1979 Southeast Ridge of Cerro Torre, Patagonia, Argentina with Steven Brewer (first alpine-style ascent of the peak)
 1979 Northwest Face, "The Ship Prow" Kichatna Spire, Alaska Range with Andy Embick
 1981 Zenyatta Mondatta (VI 5.9 A5), El Capitan, Yosemite, California with Peter Mayfield and Charlie Row
 1981 Dance of the Woo Li Masters, East Face of The Moose's Tooth, Ruth Gorge, Alaska (VI 5.9 WI4+ A4, 1520m) with Mugs Stump
 1982 South Face, "Sapphire Bullets of Pure Love" Pumori, Nepal with Jan Reynolds and Ned Gillette
 1987 The Big Chill, Half Dome, Yosemite, California with Peter Mayfield, Sean Plunkett and Steve Bosque
 1989 Shadows (VI 5.10 A5), Half Dome, Yosemite, California with Charles Row, Cito Kirkpatrick, William Westbay
 1991 North Face (repeat) The Eiger, Bernese Alps, Switzerland
 1997 Wyoming Sheep Ranch (VI 5.9 A5), (repeat) El Capitan, Yosemite, California with Giovanni Groaz
 1998 Heavy Metal and Tinker Toys (VI 5.9 A5), El Capitan, Yosemite, California with Boulos Ayad and Tyson Hausoeffer
 1998 Plastic Surgery Disaster (VI 5.8 A5), (repeat) El Capitan, Yosemite, California with Mark Bowling and Giovanni Groaz
 1999 The Useless Emotion (VII 5.9 WI4 A4), The Bear's Tooth, Ruth Glacier, Alaska with Terry Christensen, Glenn Dunmire, Brian Jonas and Brian McCray May 3–21, 1999
 1999 Odyssey, Grand Capucin(VI 5.9 A5), Mont Blanc (French Alps), with Giovanni Groaz
 1999 Dark Star (VI 5.10 A5), El Capitan, Yosemite, California with Giovanni Groaz
 2001 The Beast Pillar, (V11 5.10b WI4+ A5) The Moose's Tooth, Buckskin Glacier, Alaska with Spencer Pfinsten
 2001 Welcome to Afghanistan (VI 5.9 A4), El Capitan, Yosemite, California with Giovanni Groaz
 2002 Pointless Connection (VI 5.9 A4+), Yosemite Pointless, Yosemite, California with Giovanni Groaz
 2004 Old Guides Variation (VI 5.8 A3), El Capitan, Yosemite, California with Jackson Marsten and Giovanni Groaz

Publications

References

Bibliography

External links 
 ClimbAndMore.com

1944 births
2018 deaths
American mountain climbers
American rock climbers
People from San Antonio